Mattoon High School is located in Coles County, Mattoon, Illinois, United States.

The school mascot is the Green Wave, which represents the waves of corn in the fields surrounding the community of Mattoon.

History
On September 20, 2017, at 11:33 am, a 14-year-old male student opened fire in the school cafeteria and was quickly subdued by Angela McQueen, a math and physical education teacher. One student was struck in the chest and was driven to a nearby hospital suffering non-life-threatening wounds. The shooter was taken into custody without further incident and was charged with aggravated battery with a firearm and sent to juvenile hall.

Academics
In the 2017–18 school year, Mattoon had an enrollment of 1,013, with 88.3% of that population being Caucasian. Hispanics makeup 4.3% of the student population, surpassing the percentage of African Americans, who makeup 3.6% of the student body. In the 2017–18 school year, Mattoon had a graduation rate of 96%, with a dropout rate of 1%.

Athletics
The Green Wave currently compete in the Apollo Conference, moving there from the Big Twelve Conference in 2012. The change now pits them against teams more locally based than before, with the conference consisting of the Charleston Trojans, Effingham Flaming Hearts, Lincoln Railsplitters, Mahomet-Seymour Bulldogs, Mt. Zion Braves, and the Taylorville Tornadoes.

Boys
Baseball
Basketball
Cross Country
Football
Golf
Soccer
Tennis
Track & Field 
Wrestling

Girls
Basketball
Cross Country
Cheerleading
Dance
Golf
Softball
Soccer
Tennis
Track & Field
Volleyball

Notable Team State Finishes
Baseball: 1996 (4th)
Girls Basketball: 1977 (4th)
Softball: 2007 (2nd), 2011 (4th)

State Finals Qualifications
Baseball: 1973, 1996
Boys Cross Country: 1969–80, 2010, 2015
Football: 1974, 1990–92, 1999, 2003, 2007
Boys Golf: 1937, 1940, 1970, 1974, 1998, 2014, 2016
Boys Soccer: 2003
Dance: 2012-17
Girls Basketball: 1976–78, 1987
Girls Cross Country: 2010-13
Girls Golf: 1975–83, 1985, 1987, 1989, 1993
Softball: 2007, 2011

Apollo Conference All Sport Championships
2012, 2013, 2014, 2015, 2016

Extracurricular activities 
Outside athletics, Mattoon High School has three primary extracurricular activities that compete throughout the state and occasionally the entire nation, primarily being the "Pride Of The Green Wave" Marching Band, Choir, and Army JROTC.

Notable alumni 
 Brett Alan August (1970), recipient of the French Legion of Honor in 2015
 Otis F. Glenn (1898), U.S. Senator 
 Kyle Hudson (2004), professional baseball player, Illini football and baseball
 Joe Knollenberg (1951), U.S. Congressman 
 Will Leitch (1993), writer 
 Chad Moutray (1987), Chief Economist, National Association of Manufacturers 
 Dale Righter (1984), Illinois State Senator 
 Bill Tate (1948), Wake Forest football coach, ILLINI 52 Rose Bowl MVP 
 Craig Titley (1985), movie writer
 Arland D. Williams, Jr. (1953), a hero of Air Florida Flight 90 in January 1982, who gave his life and died to help five other survivors of the plane crash, all of whom lived.
  Sean Kollmann (1999) Actor, philanthropist, Free Diver, Iron Chef, TTT owner, Mt Everest survivor, World Chess Federation Member. https://m.imdb.com/title/tt1119646/
 Bryan D Barker (2001) Actor, Philanthropist, NFL Punter, Musician, Thrasher Article, NBA Draft Attendee and a one Hell of a Model American. https://www.espn.com/nfl/player/_/id/137/bryan-barker

References

External links 
 Mattoon High School

Schools in Coles County, Illinois
Public high schools in Illinois